"Stephanie Knows Who" is a song written by Arthur Lee and first released by Love on their 1966 album Da Capo.  It has also been released on several Love compilation albums.  It was to have been released as a single, backed with "Orange Skies", but the single was withdrawn, with "She Comes in Colors" replacing it under the same catalog number.  The song was also covered by The Move.

Lyrics and music
The song was inspired by a woman about 18 years old named Stephanie Buffington who both Lee and Love's guitarist Bryan MacLean had affections for.   Parts of "The Castle", another song on Da Capo, were inspired by the same woman.  Love drummer Michael Stuart-Ware claims that when Lee wrote the song, Stephanie was with him but by the time the band recorded the song she was with MacLean.  Stuart also believes that the romantic triangle helped lead to the deterioration of the friendship between Lee and MacLean, to the point where Lee tried to expel MacLean from the band.  According to guitarist Johnny Echols, the song's lyrics, "A tiger did, you said he did", referred to marks that Lee saw on her side, which she explained as having been caused by a childhood scratch from a tiger, though in fact they were stretch marks from a teenage pregnancy. Still today, most of the lyric listings for this song have that line deciphered incorrectly.

The song's music contains jazz elements.  AllMusic critic Matthew Greenwald has described the song as "a combination of hard, psychedelic rock with a free jazz interlude."  For the interlude, which features Johnny Echols' guitar playing and Tjay Cantrelli's (real name John Barberi) saxophone playing, the time signature shifts from 3/4 to 5/8.  Echols has described the song as "a kind of a jazz waltz", though noting that the song isn't very danceable.  Stuart-Ware has also commented that the song is hard to dance to.

Although Lee's singing on Love's debut album and on Da Capo'''s lead single "7 and 7 Is" (released months before the album) uses a harsh style, his singing  most of Da Capo uses a softer style.  "Stephanie Knows Who" is an exception, and uses the raw singing style of the debut album.  However, the instrumentation of the album is more consistent with the rest of Da Capo.  For example, Alban "Snoopy" Pfisterer's harpsichord is prominent.  The Da Capo instrumentation is particularly evident in the instrumental introduction to the song, which features MacLean's folk music-style guitar playing and Pfisterer's harpsichord.

Critical reception
AllMusic critic Matthew Greenwald praised the song as being "wonderfully quirky."  Music critic Barney Hoskyns has described the song as having garage punk angst.  Chris Hollow of The Age described the song as a jewel.  Edna Gundersen and Ken Burns of USA Today described the song as being "among the most attractively sophisticated of the era."  Author Dominic Priore considers it a prime example of Lee's "fiery passion" and remarks how the song "breaks into a jazzy solo without losing its rock 'n' roll grit."  Author  Bob Cianci praised Stuart-Ware's drumming on the song.  Colin Larkin called it one of the "strong tracks" on Da Capo.  Authors Scott Schinder and Andy Schwartz described Cantrelli's saxophone solo as being in a similar style to John Coltrane.

Other appearances
"Stephanie Knows Who" had been intended as a single release in late 1966, backed with "Orange Skies."  It was assigned catalog number EK 45608.  However, the single was withdrawn.  "She Comes in Colors", backed with "Orange Skies", was released with catalog number EK 45608 instead.  After its original release as a single and on Da Capo, "Stephanie Knows Who" was also included on a number of Love compilation albums, including Comes in Colours and Best of Love.

The Move covered "Stephanie Knows Who" on their 1968 live EP Something Else from The Move.  AllMusic critic Cub Koda describes The Move's version as "a psychedelic number with loads of wah-wah guitar from Roy Wood."  AllMusic's Richie Unterberger commented on the song's "spinning and frenetic guitar work."  The song also appears on other albums by The Move, including the reissue of Shazam.

"Stephanie Knows Who" was also covered by The Aardvarks on the multi-artist compilation album Modstock Saarbrücken 94''.

References

1967 songs
Love (band) songs
Songs written by Arthur Lee (musician)
Song recordings produced by Paul A. Rothchild
The Move songs
American garage rock songs